The politics of Australia has a mild two-party system, with two dominant political groupings in the Australian political system, the Australian Labor Party and the Liberal/National Coalition. Federally, 16 of the 151 members of the lower house (Members of Parliament, or MPs) are not members of major parties, as are 17 of the 76 members of the upper house (senators).

The Parliament of Australia has a number of distinctive features including compulsory voting, with full-preference instant-runoff voting in single-member seats to elect the lower house, the Australian House of Representatives, and the use of the single transferable vote to elect the upper house, the Australian Senate.

Other parties tend to perform better in the upper houses of the various federal and state parliaments since these typically use a form of proportional representation, except for in Tasmania where the lower house is proportionally elected and the upper house is made up of single member districts.

History

Two political groups dominate the Australian political spectrum, forming a de facto two-party system. One is the Australian Labor Party (ALP), a centre-left party which is formally linked to the Australian labour movement. Formed in 1893, it has been a major party federally since 1901, and has been one of the two major parties since the 1910 federal election. The ALP is in government in Victoria, Queensland, South Australia, Western Australia, the Northern Territory, the Australian Capital Territory and the Federal Government of Australia.

The other group is a conservative grouping of parties that are in coalition at the federal level, as well as in New South Wales, but compete in Western Australia and South Australia. The main party in this group is the centre-right Liberal Party. The Liberal Party is the modern form of a conservative grouping that has existed since the fusion of the Protectionist Party and Free Trade Party into the Commonwealth Liberal Party in 1909. Although this group has changed its nomenclature, there has been a general continuity of MPs and structure between different forms of the party. Its modern form was founded by Robert Menzies in 1944. The party's philosophy is generally liberal conservatism.

Every elected prime minister of Australia since 1910 has been a member of either the Labor Party, the Liberal Party, or one of the Liberal Party's previous incarnations (the Commonwealth Liberal Party, the Nationalist Party of Australia, and the United Australia Party).

The Liberal Party is joined by the National Party, a party that historically sought to represent rural and agricultural interests and now focuses on rural coal mining interests. The Nationals contest a limited number of seats and do not generally directly compete with the Liberal Party. Its ideology is generally more socially conservative than that of the Liberal Party. In 1987, the National Party made an abortive run for the office of prime minister in its own right, in the Joh for Canberra campaign. However, it has generally not aspired to become the majority party in the coalition, and it is generally understood that the prime minister of Australia will be a member of either the Labor or Liberal parties. On two occasions (involving Earle Page in 1939, and John McEwen from December 1967 to January 1968), the deputy prime minister, the leader of the National Party (then known as the Country Party), became the prime minister temporarily, upon the death of the incumbent prime minister. Arthur Fadden was the only other Country Party, prime minister. He assumed office in August 1941 after the resignation of Robert Menzies and served as prime minister until October of that year.

The Liberal and National parties have merged in Queensland and the Northern Territory/South Australia, although the resultant parties are different. The Liberal National Party of Queensland, formed in 2008, is a branch of the Liberal Party, but it is affiliated with the Nationals and members elected to federal parliament may sit as either Liberals or Nationals. The Country Liberal Party was formed in 1978 when the Northern Territory gained responsible government. It is a separate member of the federal coalition, but it is affiliated with the two major members and its president has voting rights in the National Party. The name refers to the older name of the National Party.

Federally, these parties are collectively known as the Coalition. The Coalition has existed continually (between the Nationals and their predecessors, and the Liberals and their predecessors) since 1923, with minor breaks in 1940, 1973, and 1987.

Historically, support for either the Coalition or the Labor Party was often viewed as being based on social class, with the upper and middle classes supporting the Coalition and the working class supporting Labor. This has been a less important factor since the 1970s and 1980s when the Labor Party gained a significant bloc of middle-class support and the Coalition gained a significant bloc of working-class support.

The two-party duopoly has been relatively stable, with the two groupings (Labor and Coalition) gaining at least 70% of the primary vote in every election since 1910 (including the votes of autonomous state parties). Third parties have only rarely received more than 10% of the vote for the Australian House of Representatives in a federal election, such as the Australian Democrats in the 1990 election and the Australian Greens in 2010, 2016 , 2019 and 2022. Additionally, support for Independent politicians in Australia has resulted in major parties having to come to agreements to form government at times, including the 2010 Australian Federal Election.

Membership requirement
To maintain registration, parties must demonstrate that they have a certain number of members.

Federally, since 2022, unless a party has current parliamentary representation, they must demonstrate they have 1,500 members. For the state and territory elections, parties require 100 members in Tasmania and the ACT, 200 in South Australia and Northern Territory, 500 in Victoria, Queensland and Western Australia, and 750 in New South Wales.

Federal parties

Federal parliamentary parties

Federal non-parliamentary parties 
Parties listed in alphabetical order as of February 2022:

State and Territory parties

New South Wales 
As of the New South Wales Electoral Commission:

Parliamentary parties

Non-parliamentary parties

Victoria 
As of the Victorian Electoral Commission:

Parliamentary parties

Non-parliamentary parties

Queensland 
As of the Queensland Electoral Commission:

Parliamentary parties

Non-parliamentary parties

Western Australia 
As of the Western Australian Electoral Commission:

Parliamentary parties

Non-parliamentary parties

South Australia 
As of the Electoral Commission of South Australia:

Parliamentary parties

Non-parliamentary parties

Tasmania 
As of the Tasmanian Electoral Commission:

Parliamentary parties

Non-parliamentary parties

Australian Capital Territory 
As listed with the ACT Electoral Commission:

Parliamentary parties

Non-parliamentary parties

Northern Territory 
As of the Northern Territory Electoral Commission:

Parliamentary parties

Non-parliamentary parties

See also

 List of historical political parties in Australia
 List of political parties by country
 Politics of Australia

References 

Political parties
Australia
Australia
 
Political parties